Ciril Grossklaus (born 17 April 1991) is a Swiss judoka.

He competed at the 2016 Summer Olympics in Rio de Janeiro, in the men's 90 kg.

References

External links
 
 

1991 births
Living people
Swiss male judoka
Olympic judoka of Switzerland
Judoka at the 2016 Summer Olympics
European Games competitors for Switzerland
Judoka at the 2015 European Games
Judoka at the 2019 European Games
21st-century Swiss people